Noémi-Noire Oursel (15 October 1847, Rouen - unknown date, 20th century) was a French librarian and biographer. In addition to many articles in several magazines, la Normandie Littéraire, le Voleur illustré, etc., Oursel published her great work, the Nouvelle Biographie normande in 1886, followed by two Suppléments (1888 and 1912).

Works 
 Nouvelle Biographie normande, Paris, Picard, 1886.
 Supplément à la Nouvelle Biographie normande, Paris, Picard, 1888.
 Nouvelle Biographie normande. Deuxième supplément, Paris, E. Dumont, 1912.
 Une Havraise oubliée, Marie Le Masson Le Golft, Évreux, Imprimerie de l’Eure, 1908.

Sources 
 Angelo De Gubernatis, Dictionnaire international des écrivains du jour, Florence, L. Niccolai, 1891, .

External links 
 Noémi-Noire Oursel on data.bnf.fr

French librarians
French women librarians
1847 births
Writers from Rouen
French biographers
French bibliographers
Women bibliographers
French lexicographers
Year of death missing